Cynog Glyndwr Dafis (born 1 April 1938) is a Welsh politician and member of Plaid Cymru.  Born Cynog Glyndwr Davies at Treboeth in Swansea, Glamorganshire, Wales, he was initially a school teacher and researcher before entering politics.

Education
Dafis was educated at the University College of Wales, Aberystwyth. During his teaching career he worked in a number of secondary schools at Pontardawe, Newcastle Emlyn, Aberaeron and Llandysul.

Political career

Member of Parliament 
Cynog Dafis first contested Ceredigion and Pembroke North in 1983 and finished in fourth place, a result repeated in 1987. His victory in 1992 was a notable one as he more than doubled his vote.

Dafis was a Member of Parliament for Ceredigion from 1992 until 2000, having been supported by a coalition of local Plaid Cymru and Green Party activists, the latter of which had worked with him on a number of environmental initiatives.

During this eight-year period as an MP, Dafis voted for homosexual law reform, against greater autonomy for schools, and for removing hereditary peers from the House of Lords.

Assembly Member 
In 2000 he resigned as an MP to devote more time as a member of the National Assembly for Wales, to which he had been elected in 1999.

In a speech at the 2000 National Eisteddfod at Llanelli, Dafis called for a new Welsh language movement with greater powers to lobby for the Welsh language at the Assembly, UK, and EU levels. Dafis felt the needs of the language were ignored during the first year of the Assembly, and that in order to ensure a dynamic growth of the Welsh language a properly resourced strategy was needed. In his speech Dafis encouraged other Welsh language advocacy groups to work closer together creating a more favourable climate in which using Welsh was "attractive, exciting, a source of pride and a sign of strength". Dafis pointed towards efforts in areas such as Catalonia and the Basque country as successful examples to emulate.

Lord Elis-Thomas, former Plaid Cymru president, disagreed with Dafis' assessment, however. At the Urdd Eisteddfod, Lord Elis-Thomas said that there was no need for another Welsh language act, claiming that there was "enough goodwill to safeguard the language's future". His controversial comments prompted Cymdeithas yr Iaith Gymraeg to join a chorus calling for his resignation as the Assembly's presiding officer.

In 2002, Dafis announced he would step down from the Assembly at the 2003 elections, despite party leader Ieuan Wyn Jones having asked him not to do so. Soon after the elections in 2003, he announced his candidacy for Presidency of the party, but lost to Dafydd Iwan.

Personal life 
He married Llinos Iorwerth Jones in 1964, with whom he had two sons and one daughter.  For many years he and his family lived in Talgarreg, before moving to Llandre.

He was made an Honorary Fellow of Aberystwyth University on 15 July 2010.

References

Sources

External links

1938 births
Living people
Plaid Cymru members of the Senedd
Wales AMs 1999–2003
Plaid Cymru MPs
UK MPs 1992–1997
UK MPs 1997–2001
Bards of the Gorsedd
People educated at Neath Grammar School for Boys
Welsh-speaking politicians